Minye Theinkhathu was a Burmese royal title, and may refer to:

Royalty
 Mingyi Swe, Viceroy of Toungoo (r. 1540–1549)
 Nanda Yawda, Gov. of Sagaing (r. 1574–1590s?), son of Thado Dhamma Yaza II of Prome
 Thalun, King of Burma (r. 1629–1648)

Other uses
 , first submarine of the Myanmar Navy

Burmese royal titles